Vegetable soup is a common soup prepared using vegetables and leaf vegetables as primary ingredients. It dates to ancient history, and is a mass-produced food product in contemporary times.

Overview

Vegetable soup is prepared using vegetables, leafy greens, mushrooms, and roots as main ingredients. Some fruits, such as tomato and squash, are considered vegetables in such a context. Vegetable soup can be prepared as a stock- or cream-based soup. Basic ingredients in addition to vegetables can include beans and legumes, grains, tofu, noodles and pasta, vegetable broth or stock, milk, cream, water, olive or vegetable oil, seasonings, salt and pepper, among myriad others. Some vegetable soups are pureed and run through a sieve, straining them to create a smooth texture. It is typically served hot, although some, such as gazpacho, are typically served cold. Vegetable soup is sometimes served as a starter or appetizer dish.

Vegetable soup is mass-produced in canned, frozen, dried, powdered, and instant varieties.

History
Vegetable soup dates to ancient history. A 5th-century Roman cookbook included a recipe for "a forerunner of onion soup." Broth is mentioned by approximately the year 1000 and potage by the 1400s. Clifford Wright has stated that cabbage soup was important in medieval Italian cuisine.

In central Appalachia, vegetable soup, also referred to as winter vegetable soup and country soup, is a traditional staple food and common dish during the months of December–February among Appalachian highlanders.

See also

 List of ancient dishes
 List of soups
 List of vegetable dishes
 List of vegetable soups

References

External links
 

 
Vegetable dishes